Moroccan Arabic, also known as Darija, is the dialectal, vernacular form or forms of Arabic spoken in Morocco. It is part of the Maghrebi Arabic dialect continuum and as such is mutually intelligible to some extent with Algerian Arabic and to a lesser extent with Tunisian Arabic. It is spoken by 92% of the population of Morocco. While Modern Standard Arabic is used to varying degrees in formal situations such as religious sermons, books, newspapers, government communications, news broadcasts and political talk shows, Moroccan Arabic is the predominant spoken language of the country and has a strong presence in Moroccan television entertainment, cinema and commercial advertising. Moroccan Arabic has many regional dialects and accents as well. Its mainstream dialect is the one used in Casablanca, Rabat, Meknès and Fez, and therefore it dominates the media, eclipsing the other regional accents, such as those spoken in Tangiers and Oujda.

SIL International classifies Moroccan Arabic, Hassaniya Arabic and Judeo-Moroccan Arabic as different varieties of Arabic.

Dialects

Moroccan Arabic was formed of several dialects of Arabic belonging to two genetically different groups: pre-Hilalian and Hilalian dialects.

Pre-Hilalian dialects

Pre-Hilalian dialects are a result of early Arabization phases of the Maghreb, from the 7th to the 12th centuries, concerning the main urban settlements, the harbors, the religious centres (zaouias) as well as the main trade routes. The dialects are generally classified in three types: (old) urban, "village" and "mountain" sedentary and Jewish dialects. In Morocco, several pre-Hilalian dialects are spoken:
Urban dialects: Old dialects of Fes, Rabat, Salé, Taza, Tétouan, Wezzan, Chefchaouen, Tangier, Asilah, Larache, Ksar el-Kebir, Meknes and Marrakesh.
Jebli dialects: Dialects of the southern and western Rif and the plains of northwestern Morocco, spoken by the Jebala, Masmuda, Ghomara, and Zenata.
Sedentary ("village") dialects of Zerhoun and Sefrou and their neighboring tribes (Zerahna tribe for Zerhoun; Kechtala, Behalil and Yazgha tribes for Sefrou), remnants of pre-Hilalian dialects that were more widely spoken before the 12th century.
Judeo-Moroccan, nearly extinct, formerly spoken by Moroccan Jews.

Hilalian dialects
Hilalian dialects (Bedouin dialects) were introduced following the migration of Arab nomadic tribes to Morocco in the 11th-century, particularly Banu Hilal which the Hilalian dialects are named after.

The Hilalian dialects spoken in Morocco belong to the Maqil subgroup, a family that includes three main dialectal areas:

 'Aroubi Arabic (Western Moroccan Arabic): spoken in the western plains of Morocco by Doukkala, Abda, Tadla, Chaouia, Gharb, and Zaers, and in the area north of Fes by Hyayna, Cheraga, Awlad Jama', etc.
 Eastern Moroccan Arabic: spoken in Oujda, the Oriental region and western Algeria (central and western Oranie)
 New urban dialects: predominantly Hilalian urban dialects, resulting from the migration movements from the countryside to cities in 20th century.
 Hassaniya Arabic: spoken in southern Morocco, Western Sahara and Mauritania). Among the dialects, Hassaniya is often considered as distinct from Moroccan Arabic.

Phonology

Vowels 

One of the most notable features of Moroccan Arabic is the collapse of short vowels. This phoneme was then deleted entirely in most positions; for the most part, it is maintained only in the position /...CəC#/ or /...CəCC#/ (where C represents any consonant and # indicates a word boundary), i.e. when appearing as the last vowel of a word. Original short  usually merges with  except in the vicinity of a labial or velar consonant. This deletion of short vowels can result in long strings of consonants (a feature shared with Amazigh and certainly derived from it). These clusters are never simplified; instead, consonants occurring between other consonants tend to syllabify, according to a sonorance hierarchy. Similarly, and unlike most other Arabic dialects, doubled consonants are never simplified to a single consonant, even when at the end of a word or preceding another consonant.

Some dialects are more conservative in their treatment of short vowels. For example, some dialects allow  in more positions. "shorter" (standard ),  "go up!" (standard  or ),  "friends" (standard ).

(Most other Arabic dialects only have a similar variation for the phoneme .) In some dialects, such as that of Marrakech, front-rounded and other allophones also exist. Allophones in vowels usually do not exist in loanwords.

Emphatic spreading (i.e. the extent to which emphatic consonants affect nearby vowels) occurs much less than in Egyptian Arabic. Emphasis spreads fairly rigorously towards the beginning of a word and into prefixes, but much less so towards the end of a word. Emphasis spreads consistently from a consonant to a directly following vowel, and less strongly when separated by an intervening consonant, but generally does not spread rightwards past a full vowel. Contrast, for example, Egyptian Arabic, where emphasis tends to spread forward and backward to both ends of a word, even through several syllables.

Actual pharyngealization of "emphatic" consonants is weak and may be absent entirely. In contrast with some dialects, vowels adjacent to emphatic consonants are pure; there is no diphthong-like transition between emphatic consonants and adjacent front vowels.

Consonants 

Phonetic notes: 
However, in some recent loanwords from European languages, a non-affricated, non-emphatic  appears, distinguished from emphatic  primarily by its lack of effect on adjacent vowels (see above; an alternative analysis is possible).
 /, / are very distinct consonants that only occur geminated, and almost always come at the beginning of a word. They function completely differently from other emphatic consonants: They are pronounced with heavy pharyngealization, affect adjacent short/unstable vowels but not full vowels, and are pronounced with a noticeable diphthongal off-glide between one of these consonants and a following front vowel. However, a few lexical items appear to have independent occurrences of these phonemes, e.g. "mother" (with attached possessive, e.g. "your mother").
Unlike in most other Arabic dialects (but, again, similar to Amazigh), non-emphatic  and emphatic  are two entirely separate phonemes, almost never contrasting in related forms of a word.
Many recent European borrowings appear to require or some other unusual emphatic consonant in order to account for the proper vowel allophones; but an alternative analysis is possible for these words where the vowel allophones are considered to be (marginal) phonemes on their own.
This does not apply to recent borrowings from MSA (e.g.
The gemination of the flap  results in a trill .

Writing 
Through most of its history, Moroccan vernacular Arabic has usually not been written. Due to the diglossic nature of the Arabic language, most literate Muslims in Morocco would write in Standard Arabic, even if they spoke Darija as a first language. However, since Standard Arabic was typically taught in Islamic religious contexts, Moroccan Jews usually would not learn Standard Arabic and would write instead in Darija, or more specifically a variety known as Judeo-Moroccan Arabic, using Hebrew script. A risala on Semitic languages written in Maghrebi Judeo-Arabic by Judah ibn Quraish to the Jews of Fes dates back to the ninth-century.

Al-Kafif az-Zarhuni's epic 14th century zajal Mala'bat al-Kafif az-Zarhuni, about Abu al-Hasan Ali ibn Othman al-Marini's campaign on Hafsid Ifriqiya, is considered the first literary work in Darija.

Most books and magazines are in Modern Standard Arabic; Qur'an books are written and read in Classical Arabic, and there is no universally standard written system for Darija. There is also a loosely standardized Latin system used for writing Moroccan Arabic in electronic media, such as texting and chat, often based on sound-letter correspondences from French, English or Spanish ('sh' or 'ch' for English 'sh', 'u' or 'ou' for English 'u', etc.) and using numbers to represent sounds not found in French or English (2-3-7-9 used for ق-ح-ع-ء, respectively.).

In the last few years, there have been some publications in Moroccan Darija, such as Hicham Nostik's Notes of a Moroccan Infidel, as well as basic science books by Moroccan physics professor Farouk El Merrakchi. Newspapers in Moroccan Arabic also exist, such as Souq Al Akhbar, Al Usbuu Ad-Daahik, the regional newspaper Al Amal (formerly published by Latifa Akherbach), and Khbar Bladna (news of our country), which was published by Tangier-based American painter Elena Prentice between 2002 and 2006.

The latter also published books written in Moroccan Arabic, mostly novels and stories, written by authors such as Kenza El Ghali and Youssef Amine Alami.

Vocabulary

Substrates 
Moroccan Arabic is characterized by a strong Berber as well as Latin (African Romance) stratum.

Following the Arab conquest, Berber languages remained widely spoken. During their Arabisation, some Berber tribes became bilingual for generations before abandoning their language for Arabic; however, they kept a substantial Berber stratum that increases from the east to the west of the Maghreb, making Moroccan Arabic dialects the ones most influenced by Berber.

More recently, the influx of Andalusi people and Spanish-speaking–Moriscos (between the 15th and the 17th centuries) influenced urban dialects with Spanish substrate (and loanwords).

Vocabulary and loanwords 
Most vocabulary of Moroccan Arabic language is derived from Classical Arabic and Amazigh, supplemented by French and Spanish loanwords.

There are noticeable lexical differences between Moroccan Arabic and most other Arabic languages. Some words are essentially unique to Moroccan Arabic: daba "now". Many others, however, are characteristic of Maghrebi Arabic as a whole including both innovations and unusual retentions of Classical vocabulary that disappeared elsewhere, such as hbeṭ "go down" from Classical habaṭ. Others are shared with Algerian Arabic such as hḍeṛ "talk", from Classical hadhar "babble", and temma "there", from Classical thamma.

There are a number of Moroccan Arabic dictionaries in existence:
 A Dictionary of Moroccan Arabic: Moroccan-English, ed. Richard S. Harrell & Harvey Sobelman. Washington, DC: Georgetown University Press, 1963 (reprinted 2004.)
 Mu`jam al-fuṣḥā fil-`āmmiyyah al-maghribiyyah معجم الفصحى في العامية المغربية, Muhammad Hulwi, Rabat: al-Madaris 1988.
 Dictionnaire Colin d'arabe dialectal marocain (Rabat, éditions Al Manahil, ministère des Affaires Culturelles), by a Frenchman named Georges Séraphin Colin, who devoted nearly all his life to it from 1921 to 1977. The dictionary contains 60,000 entries and was published in 1993, after Colin's death.

 Examples of words inherited from Classical Arabic 
 kəlb: dog (orig. kalb كلب)
 qəṭ: cat (orig. qiṭṭ قط)
 qərd: monkey (orig. qird قرد)
 šariʢ: street (orig. šariʢ شارع)
 bħar: sea (orig. baħr بحر)
 šəmš: sun (orig. šams شمس)
 bab: door (orig. bab باب)
 ħiṭ: wall (orig. ħā'iṭ حائط)
 bagra/baqra: cow (orig. baqarah بقرة)
 kla: eat (orig. akala أكل)
 fikra: idea (orig. fikrah فكرة)
 ħub: love (orig. ħubb حب)
 dhab: gold (orig. dhahab ذهب)
 ħdid: metal (orig. ħadid حديد)
 ržəl: foot (orig. rijl رجل)
 ras: head (orig. ra's رأس)
 wžəh: face (orig. wažh وجه)
 bit: room (orig. bayt بيت)
 xiṭ: wire (orig. khayṭ خيط)
 bənti: my daughter (orig. ibnati ابنتي)
 wəldi: my son (orig. waladi ولدي)
 rajəl: man (orig. rajul رجل)
 mra: woman (orig. imra'ah امرأة)
 colors=red/green/blue/yellow: ħmər/xdər/zrəq/ṣfər (orig. aħmar/axdar/azraq/aṣfar أحمر/أخضر/أزرق/أصفر)
 šħal: how much (orig. ayyu šayʾ ḥāl أَيُّ شَيْء حَال‎)
 ʕlāš: why (orig. ʿalā ʾayyi šayʾ, عَلَى أَيِّ شَيْء‎‎)
 fīn: where (orig. ʿfī ʾaynaʾ فِي أَيْنَ‎)
 ʢṭīni: give me (orig. aʢṭinī أعطني)

 Examples of words inherited from Tamazight 

 Muš: cat (orig. Amouch), pronounced 
 xizzu: carrots 
 Tekšita: typical Moroccan dress
 Lalla: lady, madam
 Henna: grandmother (jebli and northern urban dialects) / "jeda" :southern dialect
 Dšar or tšar: zone, region 
 Neggafa: wedding facilitator (orig. taneggaft) 
 Mezlot: poor
 Sebniya: veil (jebli and northern urban dialects)
 žaada: carrots (jebli and northern urban dialects)
 sarred: synonym of send (jebli and northern urban dialects)
 šlaɣem: mustache
 Awriz: heel (jebli and northern urban dialects)
 Sifet: send
 Sarut: key
 Baxuš: insect
 Kermos: figs
 zgel: miss, overlook
 tabrori: hail
 Fakron: turtle
 Tammara: hardship, worries
 bra: letter
 deġya: hurry
 dmir: hard work

 Examples of loanwords from French 

 forshita/forsheta: fourchette (fork), pronounced 
 tonobil/tomobil: automobile (car) 
 telfaza: télévision (television) 
 radio: radio , rādio is common across most varieties of Arabic).
 bartma: appartement (apartment) 
 rompa: rondpoint (traffic circle) 
 tobis: autobus (bus) 
 kamera: caméra (camera) 
 portable: portable (cell phone) 
 tilifūn: téléphone (telephone) 
 briki: briquet (lighter) 
 parisiana: a French baguette, more common is komera, stick
 disk: song
 tran: train (train) 
 serbita: serviette (napkin) 
 tabla : table (table) 
 ordinatūr/pc: ordinateur / pc
 boulis: police

 Examples of loanwords from Spanish 

Some loans might have come through Andalusi Arabic brought by Moriscos when they were expelled from Spain following the Christian Reconquest or, alternatively, they date from the time of the Spanish Protectorate in Morocco.

 rwida: rueda (wheel), pronounced 
 kuzina: cocina (kitchen) 
 skwila: escuela (school) 
 simana: semana (week) 
 manta: manta (blanket) 
 rial: real (five centimes; the term has also been borrowed into many other Arabic dialects) 
 fundo: fondo (bottom of the sea or the swimming pool) 
 karrossa: carrosa (carriage) 
 kurda: cuerda (rope) 
 kama (in the north only): cama (bed) 
 blassa: plaza (place) 
 l'banio: el baño (toilet) 
 komir: eat (but Moroccans use the expression to name the Parisian bread) 
 Disko: song (in the north only) 
 elmaryo: El armario (the cupboard) 
 playa : playa (beach) 
 mariya: marea (water flow) 
 pasiyo: paseo (walk) 
 karratera: carretera (road) 

 Examples of loanwords from Portuguese  

They are used in several coastal cities across the Moroccan coast like Oualidia, El Jadida, and Tangier.
 mala : mala (Trunk)
 kruz : da cruz (Cross)
 cabayla : cavala (Mackerel)
 crgoje (city Azemmour El Jadida Province): Dragões (Dragon)
 Rwibo/Ruibio/Robio : Ruivo (Redhaired)

 Examples of regional differences 

 Now: "deba" in the majority of regions, but "druk" or "druka" is also used in some regions in the centre and south and "drwek" or "durk" in the east.
 When?: "fuqaš" in most regions,"fe-waqt" in the Northwest (Tangier-Tetouan) but "imta" in the Atlantic region and "weqtaš" in Rabat region.
 What?: "ašnu", "šnu" or "aš" in most regions, but "šenni", "šennu" in the north, "šnu", "š" in Fes, and "wašta", "wasmu", "waš" in the far east.

 Some useful sentences 

Note: All sentences are written according to the transcription used in Richard Harrell, A Short Reference Grammar of Moroccan Arabic (Examples with their pronunciation).:
a i u = full vowels = normally , but  in the vicinity of an emphatic consonant or q ("vicinity" generally means not separated by a full vowel)
e = /ə/
q = /q/
x ġ = /x ɣ/
y = /j/
t = 
š ž = 
ḥ ʿ = 
ḍ ḷ ṛ ṣ ṭ ẓ = emphatic consonants =  (ṭ is not affricated, unlike t)

 Grammar 

 Verbs 

Introduction
The regular Moroccan Arabic verb conjugates with a series of prefixes and suffixes. The stem of the conjugated verb may change a bit, depending on the conjugation:

The stem of the Moroccan Arabic verb for "to write" is kteb.

Past tense

The past tense of kteb (write) is as follows:

I wrote: kteb-t

You wrote: kteb-ti (some regions tend to differentiate between masculine and feminine, the masculine form is kteb-t, the feminine kteb-ti)

He/it wrote: kteb (can also be an order to write; kteb er-rissala: Write the letter)

She/it wrote: ketb-et

We wrote: kteb-na

You (plural) wrote: kteb-tu / kteb-tiu

They wrote: ketb-u

The stem kteb turns into ketb before a vowel suffix because of the process of inversion described above.

Present tense

The present tense of kteb is as follows:

I am writing: ka-ne-kteb

You are (masculine) writing: ka-te-kteb

You are (feminine) writing: ka-t-ketb-i

He's/it is writing: ka-ye-kteb

She is/it is writing: ka-te-kteb

We are writing: ka-n-ketb-u

You (plural) are writing: ka-t-ketb-u

They are writing: ka-y-ketb-u

The stem kteb turns into ketb before a vowel suffix because of the process of inversion described above. Between the prefix ka-n-, ka-t-, ka-y- and the stem kteb, an e appears but not between the prefix and the transformed stem ketb because of the same restriction that produces inversion.

In the north, "you are writing" is always ka-de-kteb regardless of who is addressed.
This is also the case of de in de-kteb as northerners prefer to use de and southerners prefer te.

Instead of the prefix ka, some speakers prefer the use of ta (ta-ne-kteb "I am writing"). The coexistence of these two prefixes is from historic differences. In general, ka is more used in the north and ta in the south, some other prefixes like la, a, qa are less used. In some regions like in the east (Oujda), most speakers use no preverb (ne-kteb, te-kteb, y-kteb, etc.).

 Other tenses 

To form the future tense, the prefix ka-/ta- is removed and replaced with the prefix ġa-, ġad- or ġadi instead (e.g. ġa-ne-kteb "I will write", ġad-ketb-u (north) or ġadi t-ketb-u "You (plural) will write").

For the subjunctive and infinitive, the ka- is removed (bġit ne-kteb "I want to write", bġit te-kteb "I want 'you to write").

The imperative is conjugated with the suffixes of the present tense but without any prefixes or preverbs:

kteb Write! (masculine singular)

ketb-i Write! (feminine singular)

ketb-u Write! (plural)

 Negation 

One characteristic of Moroccan Arabic syntax, which it shares with other North African varieties as well as some southern Levantine dialect areas, is in the two-part negative verbal circumfix . (In many regions, including Marrakech, the final  vowel is not pronounced so it becomes .)

 Past:  "he wrote"  "he did not write"
 Present:  "he writes"  "he does not write"

/ma-/ comes from the Classical Arabic negator /ma/. /-ʃi/ is a development of Classical /ʃajʔ/ "thing". The development of a circumfix is similar to the French circumfix ne ... pas in which ne comes from Latin non "not" and pas comes from Latin passus "step". (Originally, pas would have been used specifically with motion verbs, as in "I did not walk a step". It was generalised to other verbs.)

The negative circumfix surrounds the entire verbal composite, including direct and indirect object pronouns:

   "he did not write them to me"
   "he does not write them to me"
   "he will not write them to me"
   "did he not write them to me?"
   "does he not write them to me?"
   "will he not write them to me?"

Future and interrogative sentences use the same  circumfix (unlike, for example, in Egyptian Arabic). Also, unlike in Egyptian Arabic, there are no phonological changes to the verbal cluster as a result of adding the circumfix. In Egyptian Arabic, adding the circumfix can trigger stress shifting, vowel lengthening and shortening, elision when /ma-/ comes into contact with a vowel, addition or deletion of a short vowel, etc. However, they do not occur in Moroccan Arabic (MA):

There is no phonological stress in MA.
There is no distinction between long and short vowels in MA.
There are no restrictions on complex consonant clusters in MA and hence no need to insert vowels to break up such clusters.
There are no verbal clusters that begin with a vowel. The short vowels in the beginning of Forms IIa(V), and such, have already been deleted. MA has first-person singular non-past /ne-/ in place of Egyptian /a-/.

Negative pronouns such as walu "nothing", ḥta ḥaja "nothing" and ḥta waḥed "nobody" can be added to the sentence without ši as a suffix:ma-ġa-ne-kteb walu "I will not write anything"ma-te-kteb ḥta ḥaja "Do not write anything"ḥta waḥed ma-ġa-ye-kteb "Nobody will write"wellah ma-ne-kteb or wellah ma-ġa-ne-kteb "I swear to God I will not write"

Note that wellah ma-ne-kteb could be a response to a command to write kteb while wellah ma-ġa-ne-kteb could be an answer to a question like waš ġa-te-kteb? "Are you going to write?"

In the north, "'you are writing" is always ka-de-kteb regardless of who is addressed. It is also the case of de in de-kteb, as northerners prefer to use de and southerners prefer te.

Instead of the prefix ka, some speakers prefer the use of ta (ta-ne-kteb "I am writing"). The co-existence of these two prefixes is from historical differences. In general ka is more used in the north and ta in the south. In some regions like the east (Oujda), most speakers use no preverb:
ka ma-ġadi-ši-te-kteb?!

In detail
Verbs in Moroccan Arabic are based on a consonantal root composed of three or four consonants.  The set of consonants communicates the basic meaning of a verb. Changes to the vowels between the consonants, along with prefixes and/or suffixes, specify grammatical functions such as tense, person and number in addition to changes in the meaning of the verb that embody grammatical concepts such as causative, intensive, passive or reflexive.

Each particular lexical verb is specified by two stems, one used for the past tense and one used for non-past tenses, along with subjunctive and imperative moods. To the former stem, suffixes are added to mark the verb for person, number and gender. To the latter stem, a combination of prefixes and suffixes are added. (Very approximately, the prefixes specify the person and the suffixes indicate number and gender.) The third person masculine singular past tense form serves as the "dictionary form" used to identify a verb like the infinitive in English. (Arabic has no infinitive.) For example, the verb meaning "write" is often specified as kteb, which actually means "he wrote". In the paradigms below, a verb will be specified as kteb/ykteb (kteb means "he wrote" and ykteb means "he writes"), indicating the past stem (kteb-) and the non-past stem (also -kteb-, obtained by removing the prefix y-).

The verb classes in Moroccan Arabic are formed along two axes. The first or derivational axis (described as "form I", "form II", etc.) is used to specify grammatical concepts such as causative, intensive, passive or reflexive and mostly involves varying the consonants of a stem form. For example, from the root K-T-B "write" are derived form I kteb/ykteb "write", form II ketteb/yketteb "cause to write", form III kateb/ykateb "correspond with (someone)" etc. The second or weakness axis (described as "strong", "weak", "hollow", "doubled" or "assimilated") is determined by the specific consonants making up the root, especially whether a particular consonant is a "w" or " y", and mostly involves varying the nature and location of the vowels of a stem form. For example, so-called weak verbs have one of those two letters as the last root consonant, which is reflected in the stem as a final vowel instead of a final consonant (ṛma/yṛmi "throw" from Ṛ-M-Y). Meanwhile, hollow verbs are usually caused by one of those two letters as the middle root consonant, and the stems of such verbs have a full vowel (/a/, /i/ or /u/) before the final consonant, often along with only two consonants (žab/yžib "bring" from Ž-Y-B).

It is important to distinguish between strong, weak, etc. stems and strong, weak, etc. roots. For example, X-W-F is a hollow root, but the corresponding form II stem xuwwef/yxuwwef "frighten" is a strong stem:
Weak roots are those that have a w or a y as the last consonant. Weak stems are those that have a vowel as the last segment of the stem. For the most part, there is a one-to-one correspondence between weak roots and weak stems. However, form IX verbs with a weak root will show up the same way as other root types (with doubled stems in most other dialects but with hollow stems in Moroccan Arabic).
 Hollow roots are triliteral roots that have a w or a y as the last consonant. Hollow stems are those that end with /-VC/ in which V is a long vowel (most other dialects) or full vowel in Moroccan Arabic (/a/, /i/ or /u/). Only triliteral hollow roots form hollow stems and only in forms I, IV, VII, VIII and X. In other cases, a strong stem generally results. In Moroccan Arabic, all form IX verbs yield hollow stems regardless of root shape: sman "be fat" from S-M-N.
 Doubled roots are roots that have the final two consonants identical. Doubled stems end with a geminate consonant. Only Forms I, IV, VII, VIII, and X yield a doubled stem from a doubled root. Other forms yield a strong stem.  In addition, in most dialects (but not Moroccan), all stems in Form IX are doubled: Egyptian Arabic iḥmáṛṛ/yiḥmáṛṛ "be red, blush" from Ḥ-M-R.
 Assimilated roots are those where the first consonant is a w or a y. Assimilated stems begin with a vowel. Only Form I (and Form IV?) yields assimilated stems and only in the non-past. There are none In Moroccan Arabic.
 Strong roots and stems are those that fall under none of the other categories described above. It is common for a strong stem to correspond with a non-strong root but the reverse is rare.

 Table of verb forms 

In this section, all verb classes and their corresponding stems are listed, excluding the small number of irregular verbs described above. Verb roots are indicated schematically using capital letters to stand for consonants in the root:
F = first consonant of root
M = middle consonant of three-consonant root
S = second consonant of four-consonant root
T = third consonant of four-consonant root
L = last consonant of root
Hence, the root F-M-L stands for all three-consonant roots, and F-S-T-L stands for all four-consonant roots. (Traditional Arabic grammar uses F-ʕ-L and F-ʕ-L-L, respectively, but the system used here appears in a number of grammars of spoken Arabic dialects and is probably less confusing for English speakers since the forms are easier to pronounce than those involving /ʕ/.)

The following table lists the prefixes and suffixes to be added to mark tense, person, number, gender and the stem form to which they are added. The forms involving a vowel-initial suffix and corresponding stem PAv or NPv are highlighted in silver. The forms involving a consonant-initial suffix and corresponding stem PAc are highlighted in gold. The forms involving no suffix and corresponding stem PA0 or NP0 are not highlighted.

The following table lists the verb classes along with the form of the past and non-past stems, active and passive participles, and verbal noun, in addition to an example verb for each class.

Notes:
Italicized forms are those that follow automatically from the regular rules of deletion of /e/.
In the past tense, there can be up to three stems:
When only one form appears, this same form is used for all three stems.
When three forms appear, these represent first-singular, third-singular and third-plural, which indicate the PAc, PA0  and PAv stems, respectively.
When two forms appear, separated by a comma, these represent first-singular and third-singular, which indicate the PAc and PA0 stems.  When two forms appear, separated by a semicolon, these represent third-singular and third-plural, which indicate the PA0 and PAv stems.  In both cases, the missing stem is the same as the third-singular (PA0) stem.
Not all forms have a separate verb class for hollow or doubled roots.  In such cases, the table below has the notation "(use strong form)", and roots of that shape appear as strong verbs in the corresponding form; e.g. Form II strong verb dˤáyyaʕ/yidˤáyyaʕ "waste, lose" related to Form I hollow verb dˤaʕ/yidˤiʕ "be lost", both from root Dˤ-Y-ʕ.

 Sample Paradigms of Strong Verbs 

 Regular verb, form I, fʕel/yfʕel 

Example: kteb/ykteb "write"

Some comments:
Boldface, here and elsewhere in paradigms, indicate unexpected deviations from some previously established pattern.
The present indicative is formed from the subjunctive by the addition of /ka-/.  Similarly, the future is formed from the subjunctive by the addition of /ɣa-/.
The imperative is also formed from the second-person subjunctive, this by the removal of any prefix /t-/, /te-/,  or /d-/.
The stem /kteb/ changes to /ketb-/ before a vowel.
Prefixes /ne-/ and /te-/ keep the vowel before two consonants but drop it before one consonant; hence singular /ne-kteb/ changes to plural /n-ketb-u/.

Example: kteb/ykteb "write": non-finite forms

 Regular verb, form I, fʕel/yfʕel, assimilation-triggering consonant 

Example: dker/ydker "mention"

This paradigm differs from kteb/ykteb in the following ways:
/ne-/ is always reduced to /n-/.
/te-/ is always reduced to /t-/, and then all /t-/ are assimilated to /d-/.
Reduction and assimilation occur as follows:
Before a coronal stop /t/, /tˤ/, /d/ or /dˤ/, /ne-/ and /te-/ are always reduced to /n-/ and /t-/.
Before a coronal fricative /s/, /sˤ/, /z/, /zˤ/, /ʃ/ or /ʒ/, /ne-/ and /te-/ are optionally reduced to /n-/ and /t-/.  The reduction usually happens in normal and fast speech but not in slow speech.
Before a voiced coronal /d/, /dˤ/, /z/, /zˤ/,  or /ʒ/, /t-/ is assimilated to /d-/.
Examples:
Required reduction /n-them/ "I accuse", /t-them/ "you accuse".
Optional reduction /n-skon/ or /ne-skon/ "I reside", /te-skon/ or /t-skon/ "you reside".
Optional reduction/assimilation /te-ʒberˤ/ or /d-ʒberˤ/ "you find".

 Regular verb, form I, fʕel/yfʕol 

Example: xrˤeʒ/yxrˤoʒ "go out"

 Regular verb, form II, feʕʕel/yfeʕʕel 

Example: beddel/ybeddel "change"

Boldfaced forms indicate the primary differences from the corresponding forms of kteb, which apply to many classes of verbs in addition to form II strong:
The prefixes /t-/, /n-/ always appear without any stem vowel.  This behavior is seen in all classes where the stem begins with a single consonant (which includes most classes).
The /e/ in the final vowel of the stem is elided when a vowel-initial suffix is added.  This behavior is seen in all classes where the stem ends in /-VCeC/ or/-VCCeC/ (where /V/ stands for any vowel and /C/ for any consonant).  In addition to form II strong, this includes form III strong, form III Due to the regular operation of the stress rules, the stress in the past tense forms beddel-et and beddel-u differs from dexl-et and dexl-u.

 Regular verb, form III, faʕel/yfaʕel 

Example: sˤaferˤ/ysˤaferˤ "travel"

The primary differences from the corresponding forms of beddel (shown in boldface) are:
The long vowel /a/ becomes /a/ when unstressed.
The /i/ in the stem /safir/ is elided when a suffix beginning with a vowel follows.

 Regular verb, form Ia, ttefʕel/yttefʕel 

Example: ttexleʕ/yttexleʕ "get scared"

 Sample Paradigms of Weak Verbs 

Weak verbs have a W or Y as the last root consonant.

 Weak , form I, fʕa/yfʕa 

Example: nsa/ynsa "forget"

The primary differences from the corresponding forms of kteb (shown in ) are:
There is no  movement of the sort occurring in kteb vs. ketb-.
Instead, in the past, there are two stems: nsi- in the first and second persons and nsa- in the third person.  In the non-past, there is a single stem nsa.
Because the stems end in a vowel, normally vocalic suffixes assume consonantal form:
Plural -u becomes -w.
Feminine singular non-past -i becomes -y.
Feminine singular third-person past -et becomes -t.

 Weak verb, form I, fʕa/yfʕi 

Example: rˤma/yrˤmi "throw"

This verb type is quite similar to the weak verb type nsa/ynsa.  The primary differences are:
The non-past stem has /i/ instead of /a/.  The occurrence of one vowel or the other varies from stem to stem in an unpredictable fashion.-iy in the feminine singular non-past is simplified to -i, resulting in homonymy between masculine and feminine singular.
Verbs other than form I behave as follows in the non-past:
 Form X has either /a/ or /i/.
 Mediopassive verb forms—i.e. Ia(VIIt), IIa(V), IIIa(VI) and Iqa(IIq) – have /a/.
 Other forms—i.e. II, III and Iq—have /i/.
Examples:
 Form II: wedda/yweddi "fulfill"; qewwa/yqewwi "strengthen"
 Form III: qadˤa/yqadˤi "finish"; dawa/ydawi "treat, cure"
 Form Ia(VIIt): ttensa/yttensa "be forgotten"
 Form IIa(V): tqewwa/ytqewwa "become strong"
 Form IIIa(VI): tqadˤa/ytqadˤa "end (intrans.)"
 Form VIII: (no examples?)
Form IX: (behaves as a strong verb)
 Form X: stedʕa/ystedʕi "invite"; but stehza/ystehza "ridicule", steħla/ysteħla "enjoy", steħya/ysteħya "become embarrassed", stăʕfa/ystăʕfa "resign"
 Form Iq: (need example)
 Form Iqa(IIq): (need example)

 Sample Paradigms of Hollow Verbs 

Hollow have a W or Y as the middle root consonant.  Note that for some forms (e.g. form II and form III), hollow verbs are conjugated as strong verbs (e.g. form II ʕeyyen/yʕeyyen "appoint" from ʕ-Y-N, form III ʒaweb/yʒaweb "answer" from ʒ-W-B).

 Hollow verb, form I, fal/yfil 

Example: baʕ/ybiʕ "sell"

This verb works much like beddel/ybeddel "teach".  Like all verbs whose stem begins with a single consonant, the prefixes differ in the following way from those of regular and weak form I verbs:
The prefixes /t-/, /j-/, /ni-/ have elision of /i/ following /ka-/ or /ɣa-/.
The imperative prefix /i-/ is missing.

In addition, the past tense has two stems: beʕ- before consonant-initial suffixes (first and second person) and baʕ- elsewhere (third person).

 Hollow verb, form I, fal/yful 

Example: ʃaf/yʃuf "see"

This verb class is identical to verbs such as baʕ/ybiʕ except in having stem vowel /u/ in place of /i/.

 Sample Paradigms of Doubled Verbs 

Doubled verbs have the same consonant as middle and last root consonant, e.g. ɣabb/yiħebb "love" from Ħ-B-B.

 Doubled verb, form I, feʕʕ/yfeʕʕ 

Example: ħebb/yħebb "love"

This verb works much like baʕ/ybiʕ "sell".  Like that class, it has two stems in the past, which are ħebbi- before consonant-initial suffixes (first and second person) and ħebb- elsewhere (third person).  Note that /i-/ was borrowed from the weak verbs; the Classical Arabic equivalent form would be *ħabáb-, e.g. *ħabáb-t.

Some verbs have /o/ in the stem: koħħ/ykoħħ "cough".

As for the other forms:
Form II, V doubled verbs are strong: ɣedded/yɣedded "limit, fix (appointment)"
Form III, VI doubled verbs optionally behave either as strong verbs or similar to ħebb/yħebb: sˤafef/ysˤafef or sˤaff/ysˤaff "line up (trans.)"
Form VIIt doubled verbs behave like ħebb/yħebb: ttʕedd/yttʕeddForm VIII doubled verbs behave like ħebb/yħebb: htemm/yhtemm "be interested (in)"
Form IX doubled verbs probably don't exist, and would be strong if they did exist.
Form X verbs behave like ħebb/yħebb: stɣell/ystɣell "exploit".

 Sample Paradigms of Doubly Weak Verbs 

"Doubly weak" verbs have more than one "weakness", typically a W or Y as both the second and third consonants. In Moroccan Arabic such verbs generally behave as normal weak verbs (e.g. ħya/yħya "live" from Ħ-Y-Y, quwwa/yquwwi "strengthen" from Q-W-Y, dawa/ydawi "treat, cure" from D-W-Y). This is not always the case in standard Arabic (cf. walā/yalī "follow" from W-L-Y).

 Paradigms of Irregular Verbs 

The irregular verbs are as follows:dda/yddi "give" (inflects like a normal weak verb; active participle dday or meddi, passive participle meddi)ʒa/yʒi "come" (inflects like a normal weak verb, except imperative aʒi (sg.), aʒiw (pl.); active participle maʒi or ʒay)kla/yakol (or kal/yakol) "eat" and xda/yaxod (or xad/yaxod) "take" (see paradigm below; active participle wakel, waxed; passive participle muwkul, muwxud'''):

 Social features 

 Evolution 
In general, Moroccan Arabic is one of the least conservative of all Arabic languages. Now, Moroccan Arabic continues to integrate new French words, even English ones due to its influence as the modern lingua franca, mainly technological and modern words. However, in recent years, constant exposure to Modern Standard Arabic on television and in print media and a certain desire among many Moroccans for a revitalization of an Arab identity has inspired many Moroccans to integrate words from Modern Standard Arabic, replacing their French, Spanish or otherwise non-Arabic counterparts, or even speaking in Modern Standard Arabic while keeping the Moroccan accent to sound less formal

Though rarely written, Moroccan Arabic is currently undergoing an unexpected and pragmatic revival. It is now the preferred language in Moroccan chat rooms or for sending SMS, using Arabic Chat Alphabet composed of Latin letters supplemented with the numbers 2, 3, 5, 7 and 9 for coding specific Arabic sounds, as is the case with other Arabic speakers.

The language continues to evolve quickly as can be noted by consulting the Colin dictionary. Many words and idiomatic expressions recorded between 1921 and 1977 are now obsolete.

Code-switching
Some Moroccan Arabic speakers, in the parts of the country formerly ruled by France, practice code-switching with French. In parts of northern Morocco, such as in Tetouan & Tangier, it is common for code-switching to occur between Moroccan Arabic, Modern Standard Arabic, and Spanish, as Spain had previously controlled part of the region and continues to possess the territories of Ceuta and Melilla in North Africa bordering only Morocco. On the other hand, some Arab nationalist Moroccans generally attempt to avoid French and Spanish in their speech; consequently, their speech tends to resemble old Andalusian Arabic.

 Literature 
Although most Moroccan literature has traditionally been written in the classical Standard Arabic, the first record of a work of literature composed in Moroccan Arabic was Al-Kafif az-Zarhuni's al-Mala'ba, written in the Marinid period.

There exists some poetry written in Moroccan Arabic like the Malhun. In the troubled and autocratic Morocco of the 1970s, Years of Lead, the Nass El Ghiwane band wrote lyrics in Moroccan Arabic that were very appealing to the youth even in other Maghreb countries.

Another interesting movement is the development of an original rap music scene, which explores new and innovative usages of the language.

Zajal, or improvised poetry, is mostly written in Moroccan Darija, and there have been at least dozens of Moroccan Darija poetry collections and anthologies published by Moroccan poets, such as Ahmed Lemsyeh and Driss Amghar Mesnaoui.

 Scientific production 
The first known scientific productions written in Moroccan Arabic were released on the Web in early 2010 by Moroccan teacher and physicist Farouk Taki El Merrakchi, three average-sized books dealing with physics and mathematics.

Newspapers
There have been at least three newspapers in Moroccan Arabic; their aim was to bring information to people with a low level of education, or those simply interested in promoting the use of Moroccan Darija. From September 2006 to October 2010, Telquel Magazine had a Moroccan Arabic edition Nichane. From 2002 to 2006 there was also a free weekly newspaper that was entirely written in "standard" Moroccan Arabic: Khbar Bladna ('News of Our Country'). In Salé, the regional newspaper Al Amal, directed by Latifa Akherbach, started in 2005.

The Moroccan online newspaper Goud or "ݣود" has much of its content written in Moroccan Arabic rather than Modern Standard Arabic. Its name "Goud" and its slogan "dima nishan" (ديما نيشان) are Moroccan Arabic expressions that mean almost the same thing "straightforward".

 See also 
 Varieties of Arabic
 Dialect continuum
 Maghrebi Arabic
 Algerian Arabic
 Tunisian Arabic
 Libyan Arabic
 Fessi dialect
 Tetuani

 References 

 Bibliography 

 Ernest T. Abdel Massih, Introduction to Moroccan Arabic, Univ. of Michigan, Washington, 1982.
 Jordi Aguadé, Notes on the Arabic Dialect of Casablanca, in: AIDA, 5th Conference Proceedings, Universidad de Cadiz, 2003, pp. 301–308.
 Jordi Aguadé, Morocco (dialectological survey), in: Encyclopedia of Arabic Language and Linguistics vol.3, Brill, 2007, pp. 287–297
 Bichr Andjar & Abdennabi Benchehda, Moroccan Arabic Phrasebook, Lonely Planet, 1999.
 Louis Brunot, Introduction à l'arabe marocain, Maisonneuve, 1950.
 Dominique Caubet, L'arabe marocain, Publ. Peeters, 1993.
 Dominique Caubet, Moroccan Arabic, in: Encyclopedia of Arabic Language and Linguistics vol.3, Brill, 2007, pp. 274–287
 Moscoso García, Francisco, Esbozo gramatical del árabe marroquí, Universidad de Castilla La Mancha, 2004.
 Olivier Durand, L'arabo del Marocco. Elementi di dialetto standard e mediano, Università degli Studi La Sapienza, Rome, 2004.
 Richard S. Harrel, A short reference grammar of Moroccan Arabic, Georgetown Univ. Press, 1962.
 Richard S. Harrel, A Dictionary of Moroccan Arabic, Georgetown Univ. Press, 1966.
 Jeffrey Heath, Ablaut and Ambiguity: Phonology of a Moroccan Arabic Dialect, State Univ. of New York Press, 1987.
 Angela Daiana Langone, Khbar Bladna, une expérience journalistique en arabe dialectal marocain, in: Estudios de Dialectologia Norteafricana y Andalusi no.7, 2003, pp. 143–151.
 Angela Daiana Langone, Jeux linguistiques et nouveau style dans la masrahiyya en-Neqsha, Le déclic, écrite en dialecte marocain par Tayyeb Saddiqi, in: Actes d'AIDA 6, Tunis, 2006, pp. 243–261.
 Abderrahim Youssi, La triglossie dans la typologie linguistique, in: La Linguistique no.19, 1983, pp. 71–83.
 Abderrahim Youssi, Grammaire et lexique de l'arabe marocain moderne'', Wallada, 1994.

External links 

 Friends of Morocco
 Mazyan Bizaf Show
 Moroccan Arabic Guide
 Moroccan Arabic Swadesh List

 
Arabic languages
Maghrebi Arabic